Taylors Beach is a coastal town and locality in the Shire of Hinchinbrook, Queensland, Australia. It takes its name from its beach.

Geography
It is bounded by the Coral Sea on the east where there are long sandy beaches. It is divided into a northern and southern section by the estuary where Victoria Creek flows into the Coral Sea; the southern section having a long northern spit providing shelter to the beaches of the northern part. The residential development is adjacent to the beaches of the northern part. Apart from some farming in the northern part, most of the locality is undeveloped.

History
The town was formerly known as Cassady after Francis Andrew O'Connor Cassady who was mayor of the City of Townsville in 1894, 1901 and 1905. However, it was renamed Taylors Beach on 1 October 1969. The name Cassady is preserved in Cassady Beach, a small beachside community within neighbouring Forrest Beach.

Education
There are no schools in Taylors Beach. The nearest government primary school is Halifax State School in neighbouring Halifax to the north-west. The nearest government secondary school is Ingham State High School in Ingham to the west.

Recreation
The town is a popular area for boating and fishing. There is a two-lane boat ramp into the estuary of Victoria Creek.

References

External links

 

 

Towns in Queensland
North Queensland
Shire of Hinchinbrook
Coastline of Queensland
Localities in Queensland